Balaustium is a genus of mites belonging to the family Erythraeidae. These are large red mites with one or two pairs of eyes set well back on the body.

Species
Species include:

Balaustium aonidophagus (Ebeling)
Balaustium angustum
Balaustium bipilum
Balaustium cristatum
Balaustium dowelli (Smiley)
Balaustium graminum
Balaustium insularum
Balaustium kendalli (Welbourn)
Balaustium lapidarium
Balaustium madeirense
Balaustium medicagoense
Balaustium murorum (Hermann, 1804)
Balaustium putmani (Smiley)
Balaustium tardum
Balaustium vignae

References

Trombidiformes genera
Taxa named by Carl von Heyden